Neurophyseta phaeozonalis is a moth in the family Crambidae. It was described by George Hampson in 1906. It is found in Guerrero, Mexico.

References

Moths described in 1906
Musotiminae